

Christoph Wilhelm Wohlien (1811–1869) was a 19th-century German painter and lithographer.

Wohlien was born 3 March 1811 in Altona, Hamburg, son to Johann Heinrich Wohlien of the Wohlien family of organ builders with their own workshop in Altona. He was a pupil of Friedrich Carl Gröger, as was Carl Gottfried Eybe with whom Wohlien shared a lifelong friendship. He died 9 May 1869.

References

External links

"Christoph Wilhelm Wohlien" at Artnet

Artists from Hamburg
19th-century German painters
19th-century German male artists
German male painters
1811 births
1869 deaths